The Diamond Apartments are an apartment building located at 321 Diamond St. in Redondo Beach, California. Built in 1913 by Harry Meacham, the apartment complex was the first commercial building in the surrounding neighborhood. Architect Lovell Pemberton designed the Classical Revival building. The first floor of the building held commercial space; early businesses in the building included a furniture store, a laundromat, and a paint store. Developers demolished all but three of Redondo Beach's downtown commercial buildings in the 1960s, leaving the apartment complex as the city's second-oldest standing commercial building and the oldest which has maintained its historic integrity.

The building was added to the National Register of Historic Places on March 26, 1992.

References

Residential buildings on the National Register of Historic Places in California
Commercial buildings on the National Register of Historic Places in California
Neoclassical architecture in California
Residential buildings completed in 1913
Commercial buildings completed in 1913
Buildings and structures on the National Register of Historic Places in Los Angeles County, California
Redondo Beach, California
1913 establishments in California